The 1915 Western Reserve football team represented Western Reserve University, now known as Case Western Reserve University, during the 1915 college football season.  The team's coach was Walter D. Powell.

Schedule

References

Western Reserve
Case Western Reserve Spartans football seasons
Western Reserve football